Javagal Srinath, (born 31 August 1969) is a former Indian cricketer and currently an ICC match referee. He is considered among India's finest fast bowlers, and was the first Indian fast bowler to take more than 300 wickets in One Day Internationals.

Srinath was a frontline fast bowler for the Indian cricket team until his retirement, and the second Indian pace bowler after Kapil Dev to take 200 Test match wickets. After Dev retired, Srinath led the Indian fast-bowling attack for over nine years. He remains India's second-highest One Day International wicket-taker with 315, second to Anil Kumble. In the four World Cup's he played in: 1992, 1996, 1999 and 2003, he took 44 wickets and is the joint highest wicket-taker for India in World Cups with Zaheer Khan.

Srinath retired from international cricket after the 2003 World Cup in South Africa.

Personal life
Srinath was born in August 1969 at Javagal village, Arsikere taluk of Hassan district in Karnataka. He played cricket from an early age. He attended Marimallappa High School and has a Bachelor of Engineering degree in instrumentation from Sri Jayachamarajendra College of Engineering (SJCE) in Mysore. He married his first wife, Jyothsna, in 1999. After their divorce, he married journalist Madhavi Patravali in 2008.

Domestic career
Srinath caught the eye of former Indian Test batsman Gundappa Viswanath, a selector for the state team, during a club match. He made his first-class debut for Karnataka against Hyderabad in 1989–90, taking a hat-trick in the first innings in which he bowled and taking wickets from successive balls in the second. He finished the season with 25 wickets in six matches, and took another 20 the following season. His second season involved a display of reverse swing against Maharashtra at Nehru Stadium in Pune, taking 7/93 to dismiss the home team for 311 in response to a Karnataka total of 638 on a good batting pitch.

Srinath took over 500 first-class wickets, incluiding 96 at an average of 24.06 runs per wicket for  Karnataka. He played in English county cricket for Gloucestershire in 1995 and took 87 wickets that season, including 9/76 against Glamorgan. Srinath also played county cricket for Leicestershire and Durham.

International career
Srinath made his One Day International debut at Sharjah in 1991. He played 11 ODIs and two Test matches in his debut year, taking 14 ODI wickets at an average of 30.00. He was selected for the Indian team for its 1991–92 tour of Australia, making his test debut against Australia at Brisbane. He took 3/59 as the third fast bowler during the match and finished the tour with ten wickets at 55.30. With an opportunity to take the new ball against South Africa in Cape Town, he took an economical 4/33 in 27 overs and ended the tour with 12 wickets at 26.08. Because the wickets in India were conducive to spin, however, Srinath spent seven consecutive home Test matches watching from the sidelines as India fielded only two fast bowlers.

Following the retirement of Kapil Dev in late 1994, Srinath played his first home Test match, playing against the West Indies. He took five wickets and scored 60 in the second innings to be named Player of the Match. His increased opportunities coincided with an improvement in his batting, and he scored two half-centuries during the series.

Srinath was considered a very fast bowler in his early years. He and Grant Flower had also faced Waqar Younis and Wasim Akram. Srinath was India's only regular fast bowler for many years, and his workload is believed to have caused his injuries; he underwent surgery on his right shoulder in 1997.

Injuries
Srinath's rotator-cuff injury, diagnosed in March 1997, kept him away from cricket until November of that year and affected his speed. The injury was caused by overuse. At the time, he had 92 test wickets in 27 tests—46 in his first 18, and 46 in his last nine matches. There were some doubts about whether he would be able to play again and when he announced his retirement in November 2003, Srinath said that he thought his career was over when he was recovering from the rotator-cuff injury.

He returned from injury in 1998 and took 17 wickets in Test matches and 37 wickets in 19 ODIs at an average of 22.00—the best year of his career.

Late career
With a change of Indian captain in 2000, Srinath was given fewer overs than Anil Kumble in Test matches. He was primarily used in ODIs and Test matches played outside of India, taking 21 Test and 15 ODI wickets in 2000. He took nine wickets against Zimbabwe in Delhi, and received his last Test Player of the Match award that year.

Inactive for much of 2001 due to emerging bowlers such as Zaheer Khan and Ajit Agarkar, he played eight Test matches and 15 ODIs. His Test career ended in 2002. Although Srinath wanted to retire from ODI, at the request of Indian captain Sourav Ganguly he agreed to play until the World Cup. He participated in India's tour of New Zealand in January a few weeks before the World Cup, taking 18 wickets in seven matches.

Bowling
Srinath was the second Indian bowler (after Kapil Dev) to take 200 wickets in Test cricket, with 236. Although some critics said that Srinath's average and strike rate suffered as a result of bowling to India's predominantly dry, spin-friendly wickets, his average at home was superior to his average abroad since he knew could reverse-swing the ball.

Retirement
Srinath toured England with the Lashings World XI team in summer 2005, and was a commentator for the India-England test series in 2006. In an interview, 1992 World Cup-winning Pakistan captain Imran Khan said that after watching Srinath bowl  on Indian pitches he considered him the most underrated bowler in the world. Courtney Walsh recommended Srinath for county cricket when he was injured. Srinath is a familiar face to cricket viewers around the world as a commentator and ICC match referee. In 2010, he and former teammate Anil Kumble contested the Karnataka State Cricket Association elections. They won and Srinath, as secretary of the association, promotes young cricketers in Karnataka.

Referee
In April 2006, Srinath was selected as a match referee by the International Cricket Council and served during the 2007 World Cup. He has refereed in 35 test matches, 194 ODIs and 60 T20Is.

Honours
 Arjuna Award – 1999

See also
 Elite Panel of ICC Referees

References

External links

1969 births
Living people
Cricket match referees
Cricketers at the 1992 Cricket World Cup
Cricketers at the 1996 Cricket World Cup
Cricketers at the 1999 Cricket World Cup
Cricketers at the 2003 Cricket World Cup
Cricketers from Mysore
Durham cricketers
Gloucestershire cricketers
India One Day International cricketers
India Test cricketers
Indian cricketers
Karnataka cricketers
Leicestershire cricketers
Recipients of the Arjuna Award
South Zone cricketers